Stenacron is a genus in the family Heptageniidae, the flat-headed mayflies. Almost all species are distributed across eastern North America.

Life History

Although larvae can be found in many different conditions, they have some basic and preferred requirements. They tend to cling to the underside of rocks that are a minimum of 8 X 8 inches and 2 inches thick. Larger rocks contain greater populations of Stenacron species. They are seldom found in the faster riffle waters but instead at the slower moving banks, typically with a water depth of no less than 3 inches and up to 16 inches deep. Stenacron can live in waters that are not moving and low in DO, however, they prefer a stable and moderate DO in which greater populations will occur. Lewis showed that the form (Stenacron interpunctatum / heterotarsale) historically carried an EBI (Empirical Biotic Index) rating of a level (7) showing a high tolerance level to pollution's both Toxic and Organic.

Taxonomy

History 
Thomas Say first documented the species interpunctatum in 1839 in Indiana from 20 halotypes and 14 paratypes. Hagan (1861) confirms and expands the geographical range of the species with the collection of others in Virginia that concurred with Says (1839) halotypes.Dr. J. R. Traver, the second author of the Biology of a Mayfly, ted three distinct groups in the genus Stenonema in 1933. The interpunctatum group later became the genus Stenacron. Steven L Jensen listed the genus as Stenacron in 1974.

Species 
Although there are 7 recognized species in the genus, the variation amongst populations of Stenacron interpunctatum forms the Stenacron interpunctatum complex, which comprises 16 closely related subspecies. 

List of the currently valid species as of 2014:
 Stenacron candidum (Traver, 1935) i c g b
 Stenacron carolina (Banks, 1914) i c g b
 Stenacron floridense (Lewis, 1974) i c g b
 Stenacron gildersleevei (Traver, 1935) i c g b (Gildersleeve's Stenacron Mayfly)
 Stenacron interpunctatum (Say, 1839) i c g b (Stenacron Mayfly)
 Stenacron minnetonka (Daggy, 1945) i c g b
 Stenacron pallidum (Traver, 1933) i c g b
Data sources: i = ITIS, c = Catalogue of Life, g = GBIF, b = Bugguide.net

Synonym forms that make up the interpunctatum complex.
Stenacron interpunctatum / affine
Stenacron interpunctatum / areion
Stenacron interpunctatum / canadense
Stenacron interpunctatum / conjunctum
Stenacron interpunctatum / frontale
Stenacron interpunctatum / heterotarsale
Stenacron interpunctatum / majus
Stenacron interpunctatum / ohioense
Stenacron interpunctatum / proximum

Larval development

Spieth 1947; “No experimental evidence exists to indicate how much or how little coloration of the imaginal individuals of this genus is independent of the environment in which the nymphs develop. Circumstantial evidence Spieth (1938) indicates, and such evidence is constantly accumulating, that the environment may play a part in determining the degree of coloration of the adults”

Spieth 1947; “When confronted with a large series, especially from the areas around the Great Lakes, more “intermediate” than “typical” specimens are invariably found”

Lewis 1974; “Studies should be designed to ascertain whether the apparent hybrids are truly hybrids or are environmental variants within species. The influence of glaciation and biogeography on the distribution of several populations needs investigation”

References

Further reading

External links

 

Mayfly genera
Mayflies